Mixocera parvulata is a moth of the family Geometridae first described by Francis Walker in 1863. It is found in India, Sri Lanka, Maldives, Vietnam, Ethiopia, Kenya, Madagascar, South Africa, Tanzania and Zimbabwe

References

Moths of Asia
Moths described in 1863